The Norwegian Trekking Association (DNT) is a Norwegian association which maintains mountain trails and cabins in Norway. The association was founded on 21 January 1868 with the scope "to help and develop tourism in this country". Today the goal is to work for simple, secure and environmentally friendly outdoor activities. DNT has currently more than 300,000 individual members, and 57 local chapters. It also has several "honorary members", prominent people who have shown a keen interest in Norwegian nature and given the country publicity as a tourist destination, among them Kofi Annan and Katie Melua. The secretary-general of the association is Dag Terje Klarp Solvang.

The mountains of Norway have always been utilised by the Norwegian people since the first Norwegians followed the reindeer when the ice cap retracted ten thousand years ago.

DNT's first hut was Krokan by the Rjukan waterfall.  The waterfall was later harnessed for hydropower production and the hut was sold.  Today it is re-opened, situated by the main road from Tinn to Vinje. Together with local organisations all over Norway, it operates more than 550 cabins in Norwegian mountains and forest areas.

Olav Thon, a Norwegian real-estate investor and hobby trekker, has so far donated  to the association. The money has been spent to build new and refurbish existing cabins.

Using the huts
Forty one of the huts are staffed. The rest are self-service, some with provisions and some without. The self-service huts are occasionally locked, and to use them it is necessary to get a key from the DNT for a NOK 100 deposit (if the key is returned, so is the money). Every self-service hut contains a stack of debit/credit card forms for payment. This form must be filled out at the conclusion of a stay and dropped into the payment box. You must register before using a bunk.

Most self-service huts have solar panels, and therefore electricity, but no running water, so they are usually located very close to a river from which buckets may be filled. Before leaving a self-service hut, it is considered good etiquette to carry in firewood, do the dishes, clean the floor and (if necessary) lock the door behind you.

See also
Tourism in Norway
List of national parks of Norway
UT.no

References

External links

Official website
UT.no Trip planning website by DNT and NRK  (Translations available) 
Yr.no weather forecasts for DNT huts
 Maps with DNT huts

Tourism in Norway
Organisations based in Oslo
Sports organizations established in 1868
Hiking trails in Norway
Sports organisations of Norway
Hiking organizations
Hiking governing bodies